Sally Kirkland (born October 31, 1941) is an American film, television and stage actress and producer. A former member of Andy Warhol's The Factory and an active member in 1960s New York avant-garde theater, she has appeared in more than 250 film and television productions during her 60-year career. Kirkland is the daughter of a fashion editor of Life magazine and Vogue Sally Kirkland.

Kirkland was nominated for the Academy Award for Best Actress for her performance in Anna (1987). She won the Golden Globe for Best Performance by an Actress in a Motion Picture – Drama for her role and received awards from the Los Angeles Film Critics Association, and the Independent Spirit Awards. She earned a second Golden Globe nomination for Best Performance by an Actress in a Miniseries or Motion Picture Made for Television for The Haunted (1991). Kirkland is also known for her roles in Cold Feet (1989), Best of the Best (1989), JFK (1991) and Bruce Almighty (2003).

Early life
Kirkland was born in New York City. She was named after her mother, Sally Kirkland (born Sarah Phinney), who was a fashion editor at Vogue and LIFE magazines, and was raised in Oklahoma. Her father, Frederic McMichael Kirkland, worked in the scrap metal business. Kirkland started out as a Vogue model and then studied at the Actors Studio with Lee Strasberg and Uta Hagen.

Career

Kirkland began acting Off-Broadway in 1963. She joined Andy Warhol's The Factory and appeared nude and tied to a chair for 45 minutes in the 1964 drama film The 13 Most Beautiful Women. By 1964, Kirkland was deeply involved in the New York's avant-garde movement and was also an active drug user until an attempted suicide frightened her into cleaning up her life through yoga and painting. Four years later, she returned to film, appearing in the western Blue, and the following year starred in the underground film Coming Apart (1969).

Kirkland spent the 1970s and most of the 1980s playing secondary roles in film include Going Home (1971), The Young Nurses (1973), The Way We Were (1973), The Sting (1973), Big Bad Mama (1974), Crazy Mama (1975), A Star Is Born and Private Benjamin (1980). She played a leading role in the 1984 horror film Fatal Games. Her television credits include guest-starring roles on Hawaii Five-O, Police Story, The Rookies, Three's Company, Kojak, Starsky & Hutch, Charlie's Angels and Falcon Crest.

In 1987, Kirkland received positive reviews from critics and Academy Award for Best Actress nomination for playing title role in the independent drama film Anna. For this performance she won a Golden Globe Award for Best Actress in a Motion Picture – Drama, a Los Angeles Film Critics Association Award, and an Independent Spirit Award for Best Female Lead. Her performance received widespread critical praise, in a performance that the Washington Post deemed "superb" and the Los Angeles Times rated her as one of the best actresses of the decade. Kirkland later acted in second-grade films include Cold Feet (1989), Paint It Black (1989) and Two Evil Eyes (1990).

In 1990s, Kirkland starred in action comedy Bullseye! (1990) opposite Michael Caine, and played supporting roles in films Revenge (1990), JFK (1991), The Player (1992), Gunmen (1994), Excess Baggage (1997) and EDtv (1999). She starred in the erotic thrillers In the Heat of Passion and Double Threat in 1992, which found success in home video releases. She found better success on television, playing leading roles in a number of made-for-television movies, and starring in the syndicated soap opera Valley of the Dolls in 1994. In 1990, she also played Truvy Jones in the television adaptation of Steel Magnolias. For her performance in the television film The Haunted (1991), Kirkland received Golden Globe Award for Best Actress – Miniseries or Television Film nomination. She guest-starred in Roseanne, Murder, She Wrote and The Nanny. In 1999, she had a recurring roles in Felicity and Days of Our Lives. In 2000s, she played supporting roles in films include Bruce Almighty (2003), Adam & Steve (2005) and Big Stan (2007).
  
Kirkland hosted a weekly program on the syndicated HealthyLife Radio Network. In 2019, she starred in the film Cuck. In 2020, she starred in the Amazon release film Hope For The Holidays with Robert Lasardo, Doug Hutchison, Alex Cubis George Stults.

Other work and activism 
Kirkland is also a health activist including advocating for women harmed by breast implants. She founded the Kirkland Institute for Implant Survival Syndrome in August 1998.

Kirkland is an ordained minister in the church of Movement of Spiritual Inner Awareness.

She is a gallery-shown painter and a noted acting teacher whose students have included Sandra Bullock, Barbra Streisand, Liza Minnelli, Dwight Yoakam, and Roseanne Barr, among others.

Filmography

Film

Television

Awards and nominations

References

External links
 
 
 
 
 
 
 Sally Kirkland at the University of Wisconsin's Actors Studio audio collection

Actresses from New York City
Actresses from Philadelphia
American film actresses
American health activists
American stage actresses
American television actresses
Best Drama Actress Golden Globe (film) winners
Independent Spirit Award for Best Female Lead winners
Living people
Movement of Spiritual Inner Awareness
21st-century American women
1941 births